Versailles is the eponymous fourth studio album by Versailles. It was released on September 26, 2012.

Track listing

References

Versailles (band) albums
2012 albums